Burmasovo is a rural locality (a village)  in Cheryomushskoye Rural Settlement of Kotlassky District, Arkhangelsk Oblast, Russia. The population was 14 as of 2010.

Geography 
Burmasovo is located on the Ukhtomka River, 24 km south of Kotlas (the district's administrative centre) by road. Medvedki is the nearest rural locality.

References 

Rural localities in Kotlassky District